The women's 440 yards event at the 1966 British Empire and Commonwealth Games was held on 6 and 8 August at the Independence Park in Kingston, Jamaica. It was the first and last time that this imperial distance was contested at the Games for women later replaced by the 400 metres.

Medalists

Results

Heats

Qualification: First 2 in each heat (Q) and the next 2 fastest (q) qualify for the final.

Final

References

Athletics at the 1966 British Empire and Commonwealth Games
1966